This is a list of all 142 Biograph films released in 1909.

Releases

References

Bibliography

Biograph Company films